J. F. Schroer House-Store is a historic home and store located at Augusta, St. Charles County, Missouri. The house was built about 1865–1866, and is a -story, brick dwelling with a central passage plan.  The store occupied the first floor with living quarters above.  It measures approximately 50 feet wide by 36 feet deep and has a side-gable roof and wine cellar.

It was added to the National Register of Historic Places in 1995.

References

Houses on the National Register of Historic Places in Missouri
Houses completed in 1866
Buildings and structures in St. Charles County, Missouri
National Register of Historic Places in St. Charles County, Missouri